Vaddukoddai Electoral District was an electoral district of Sri Lanka between August 1947 and February 1989. The district was named after the town of Vaddukoddai in Jaffna District, Northern Province. The 1978 Constitution of Sri Lanka introduced the proportional representation electoral system for electing members of Parliament. The existing 160 mainly single-member electoral districts were replaced with 22 multi-member electoral districts. Vaddukoddai electoral district was replaced by the Jaffna multi-member electoral district at the 1989 general elections, the first under the PR system, though Vaddukoddai continues to be a polling division of the multi-member electoral district.

Members of Parliament
Key

Elections

1947 Parliamentary General Election
Results of the 1st parliamentary election held between 23 August 1947 and 20 September 1947:

1952 Parliamentary General Election
Results of the 2nd parliamentary election held between 24 May 1952 and 30 May 1952:

1956 Parliamentary General Election
Results of the 3rd parliamentary election held between 5 April 1956 and 10 April 1956:

1960 (March) Parliamentary General Election
Results of the 4th parliamentary election held on 19 March 1960:

1960 (July) Parliamentary General Election
Results of the 5th parliamentary election held on 20 July 1960:

1965 Parliamentary General Election
Results of the 6th parliamentary election held on 22 March 1965:

1970 Parliamentary General Election
Results of the 7th parliamentary election held on 27 May 1970:

1977 Parliamentary General Election
Results of the 8th parliamentary election held on 21 July 1977:

T. Thirunavukarasu died on 1 August 1982. His replacement Neelan Tiruchelvam was sworn in on 8 March 1983.

Neelan Tiruchelvam and all other TULF MPs boycotted Parliament from the middle of 1983 for a number of reasons: they were under pressure from Sri Lankan Tamil militants not to stay in Parliament beyond their normal six-year term; the Sixth Amendment to the Constitution of Sri Lanka required them to swear an oath unconditionally renouncing support for a separate state; and the Black July riots in which up to 3,000 Tamils were murdered by Sinhalese mobs. After three months of absence, Tiruchelvam forfeited his seat in Parliament on 22 October 1983.

References & footnotes

Former electoral districts of Sri Lanka
Politics of Jaffna District